The Paris Peace Conference gathered over 30 nations at the Quai d'Orsay in Paris, France, to shape the future after World War I. The Russian SFSR was not invited to attend, having already concluded a peace treaty with the Central Powers in the spring of 1918. The Central Powers - Austria-Hungary, Germany, Bulgaria and the Ottoman Empire - were not allowed to attend the conference until after the details of all the peace treaties had been elaborated and agreed upon. The main result of the conference was the Treaty of Versailles with Germany.

Signing delegations

This list shows all nations and delegations who signed the Treaty of Versailles. All plenipotentiaries signed the treaty, except where indicated otherwise.

Other national representatives 

Despite not signing the treaties, other delegations were sent to the Paris Peace Conferences, some uninvited, in order to represent their national interests.

Non-national representatives 

Other non-national or pan-national delegations were in Paris, hoping to petition the allies on issues relating to their causes.

Oversights 
An oft-stated myth is that the Principality of Andorra was not invited to attend, due to an 'oversight' and that the issue of Andorra being at war was eventually resolved on September 24, 1958, when a peace treaty was signed. This claim first appeared in North American newspapers in 1958 and has been repeated since. In reality, Andorra did not officially participate in World War I. In 2014, the news outlet Ràdio i Televisió d'Andorra investigated the 1958 claim and could find no documentation of any original declaration of war. Historian Pere Cavero could only find an exchange of letters between the German consul in Marseille and the Catalan Ombudsman, where the former asks if there is a state of war with Andorra and the latter responds they could find nothing in their archive to indicate this.

References

Paris Peace Conference (1919–1920)
Participants to meetings
Paris Peace Conference, 1919
Paris Peace Conference